Faridupur Zilla School is a secondary school in Faridpur, the headquarters of Faridpur District, Bangladesh. In 1840 the then district magistrate Edgar Ef Luther, established a school named English Seminary School. In 1851 the British Government took the responsibility of the school and named it Faridpur Zilla School.

Notable alumni
 Dr. Quazi Deen Mohammad, Neurologist

See also
List of Zilla Schools of Bangladesh

References

High schools in Bangladesh
1840 establishments in British India
Educational institutions established in 1840
Boys' schools in Bangladesh